South Carolina Highway 121 may refer to:

South Carolina Highway 121, a state highway from south of North Augusta to Rock Hill
South Carolina Highway 121 (1920s), a former state highway from Aiken to Springdale
South Carolina Highway 121 (1930s–1960s), a former state highway from southwest of Branchville to Vance

121 (disambiguation)